The genus Phyllotheca was created in 1828, when Brongniart described the type species Phyllotheca australis coming from Hawkesbury River, Australia.

Species
 Phyllotheca australis: Initially described by Brongniart coming from Australia.
 Phyllotheca brevifolia: Described by Roesler, Boardman and Iannuzzi. Found in Paleorrota geopark on Morro Papaléo in Mariana Pimentel, Brazil. The area is in Rio Bonito Formation dating from Sakmarian in the Permian.
 Phyllotheca indica: Described by Towrow in 1955. Coming from India.
 Phyllotheca longifolia: Described by Roesler and Boardman. Found in Paleorrota geopark on Morro Papaléo in Mariana Pimentel, Brazil. The area is in Rio Bonito Formation dating from Sakmarian in the Permian.

References

Equisetales
Permian plants
Prehistoric plant genera
Permian first appearances
Permian genus extinctions
Fossil taxa described in 1828